Oreta rubrifumata is a moth in the family Drepanidae. It was described by William Warren in 1923. It is found on Bougainville Island and Tulagi in the Solomon Islands.

References

Moths described in 1923
Drepaninae